Upon a Time is a studio album by American jazz guitarist John Abercrombie with drummer George Marsh and bassist Mel Graves. The album was recorded in California in 1982 and released by New Albion Records in 1989.

Reception
A reviewer of Allmusic awarded the album two stars out of five, stating "John Abercrombie's 1989 release Upon a Time is, as the subtitle points out, an album of duets, mostly with bassist Mel Graves and drummer George Marsh. While bass and drum solos are often the punchlines of musical jokes, Graves and Marsh are skilled players with enough good taste to keep the flashiness to an interesting minimum. As for guitarist Abercrombie, his playing is typically brilliant, whether picking out the traditional melody of 'My Scottish Heart' or moving into a more impressionistic sonic arena in tracks like 'In the Woods' or 'Chuck Man Rivers.' Earthier and more expressly jazz-based than many releases on the ECM-affiliated New Albion label, Upon a Time is a satisfying, richly rewarding album."

Track listing

Personnel
John Abercrombie – electric guitar, mandolin, mando-guitar, piano
Mel Graves – double bass, bass guitar
George Marsh – drums, percussion, thumb piano

References

John Abercrombie (guitarist) albums
1991 albums